Nocita is a surname. Notable people with the surname include: 

Salvatore Nocita (born 1934), Italian television and film director, editor, and screenwriter
Tony Nocita (born 1963), Canadian soccer player and coach

Italian-language surnames